Julien Gauthier (born October 15, 1997) is a Canadian professional ice hockey forward for the  Ottawa Senators of the National Hockey League (NHL). Gauthier was drafted 21st overall by the Carolina Hurricanes in the 2016 NHL Entry Draft. He also played for the New York Rangers.

Playing career
Gauthier was drafted by Val-d'Or Foreurs in the first round (sixth overall) of the 2013 QMJHL Entry Draft, and played with Val-d'Or from the 2013–14 season to the 2016–17 season.

On July 9, 2016, Gauthier was signed to his first NHL deal in agreeing to a three-year, entry-level contract with the Carolina Hurricanes. In the following 2016–17 season, his fourth season with the Foreurs, Gauthier had registered 27 points in 23 games before he was traded to contending team, the Saint John Sea Dogs in exchange for future picks and Nathan Cyr-Trottier on January 6, 2017. After playing one season for the Sea Dogs, Gauthier attended the Hurricanes training camp prior to the 2017–18 season and was assigned to the Charlotte Checkers, the American Hockey League (AHL) affiliate of the Hurricanes.

During the 2019–20 season, on February 18, 2020, Gauthier was traded by the Hurricanes to the New York Rangers in exchange for defenceman Joey Keane. On February 10, 2021, Gauthier scored his first career NHL goal against the Boston Bruins. After spending the end of the 2019–20 season and the entire 2020–21 and 2021–22 seasons with the Rangers, Gauthier cleared waivers and was assigned to New York's AHL affiliate, the Hartford Wolf Pack, prior to the start of the 2022–23 season. On October 26, 2022, Gauthier was recalled by the Rangers.

On February 19, 2023, Gauthier was traded, along with a conditional draft pick in the 2023 NHL Entry Draft, to the Ottawa Senators for Tyler Motte.

International play

On December 1, 2015, Gauthier was invited to the Team Canada selection camp for the 2016 World Junior Hockey Championships. He was the only draft-eligible player to end up participating in the tournament for Canada.

Personal life
He is the nephew of former NHL player Denis Gauthier. His father and grandfather were professional wrestlers.

Career statistics

Regular season and playoffs

International

Awards and honours

References

External links

 

1997 births
Living people
Canadian ice hockey right wingers
Carolina Hurricanes draft picks
Carolina Hurricanes players
Charlotte Checkers (2010–) players
Hartford Wolf Pack players
National Hockey League first-round draft picks
New York Rangers players
Ottawa Senators players
Saint John Sea Dogs players
Val-d'Or Foreurs players